Jesús Aparicio-Bernal Sánchez (born june 15, 1929 in Madrid) is a Spanish politician who began his career under the Francoist State.

Biography 
Having read jurisdiction at university, Aparicio-Bernal became a representative (procurador) to the Cortes Generales during the Francoist era, first as a trade union representative in 1955, 1958, and 1961, and for Alicante between 1967 and 1977.

He was also the national director of the Sindicato Español Universitario (SEU), the university syndicate of the Spanish Falange movement, from 1957 to February 1962. Rodolfo Martín Villa succeeded him in the post. In 1963, Aparicio-Bernal was designated as president of the Sindicato Nacional de Prensa y Gráficas.

On 26 March 1964, Manuel Fraga Iribarne, then Minister for Information and Tourism, appointed him as the Director General of Radio Difusión y Televisión, a position equivalent to the current Chair of Corporación de Radio y Televisión Española. In this capacity, on 18 July of the same year, Aparicio-Bernal ordered the creation of Televisión Española studios at Prado del Rey in Pozuelo de Alarcón, the current central headquarters of the Corporation.

As an adjunct professor, he also taught business law at the Complutense University of Madrid. Aparicio-Bernal identifies as a secular humanist and an atheist, and is strongly critical of religion.

References

1929 births
Living people
Politicians from Madrid
Members of the Cortes Españolas
Academic staff of the Complutense University of Madrid
Spanish atheists
Spanish humanists
Secular humanists
Critics of religions